Eugongylus unilineatus is a species of lizard in the family Scincidae. It is found in Papua New Guinea.

References

Eugongylus
Reptiles described in 1915
Reptiles of Papua New Guinea
Endemic fauna of Papua New Guinea
Taxa named by Nelly de Rooij
Skinks of New Guinea